Symbolophorus is a genus of lanternfishes. It feeds on various small forms of sea life, in particular fish. Some species in this genus are known to exhibit the Stylophthalmine trait in their larval form

Species 
There are currently eight recognized species in this genus:
 Symbolophorus barnardi (Tåning, 1932) (Barnard's lanternfish)
 Symbolophorus boops (J. Richardson, 1845) (Bogue lanternfish)
 Symbolophorus californiensis (C. H. Eigenmann & R. S. Eigenmann, 1889) (Bigfin lanternfish)
 Symbolophorus evermanni (C. H. Gilbert, 1905) (Evermann's lanternfish)
 Symbolophorus kreffti Hulley, 1981
 Symbolophorus reversus Gago & Ricord, 2005 (Reverse gland lanternfish)
 Symbolophorus rufinus (Tåning, 1928)
 Symbolophorus veranyi (É. Moreau, 1888) (Large-scale lanternfish)

References

Myctophidae
Extant Miocene first appearances
Taxa named by Rolf Ling Bolin
Marine fish genera